Mississippi Highway 19 (MS 19) is a state highway in Mississippi. The highway is actually part of a long multi-state route that goes through Alabama and Georgia.

Route description

MS 19 begins in Lauderdale County at the Alabama state line, where it continues into that state as Alabama State Route 10 (SR 10). It heads northwest as a two-lane highway through wooded and hilly terrain for several miles, where it passes through the community of Whynot and has an intersection with MS 496, before widening to a four-lane divided highway as it enters the Meridian city limits. The highway heads east through suburbs to have an interchange with US 45, as well as an intersection with Jimmie Rodgers Parkway as it passes by Bonita Lakes Park, before entering a business and becoming concurrent (overlapped) with I-20/I-59/US 11/US 80 (Exit 154 A/B) at an intersection with MS 39. They head west to bypass downtown along its southern edge as a four-lane freeway, having interchanges with MS 145 and MS 493 (22nd Avenue; Exit 153), as well as 29th Avenue (Exit 152), and 49th Avenue (Exit 151). MS 19 splits off at Exit 150, with departing and heading south at the same exit, which lies just north of Meridian Regional Airport. The highway heads north as a four-lane undivided highway through a business district far a little over a mile before making a sharp left turn onto 8th Street and passing by Meridian Community College. MS 19 passes through neighborhoods, where it has an intersection with Old Highway 80 W, before turning northwest to leave Meridian and widen to a divided highway. It crosses over Okatibbee Creek before passing through the communities of Nellieburg, Hookston (where it has an intersection with MS 494), and Collinsville (where it briefly narrows to an undivided highway and passes by Okatibbee Lake and Dam). The highway now briefly enters the northeastern corner of Newton County, where it has an intersection with MS 491, before entering Neshoba County.

MS 19 passes through the community of House, where it has an intersection with MS 492, before narrowing to two-lanes and traveling through a portion of the Mississippi Band of Choctaw Indians Reservation, where it passes through the community of Tucker. The highway now enters the Philadelphia city limits along Holland Avenue and immediately passes through a business district before passing through neighborhoods to become concurrent with MS 16, with the road heading west into downtown as a one-way pair between Main Street and Beacon Street. MS 16/MS 19 are almost immediately joined by MS 21 (Pecan Avenue) and the highway passes straight through the heart of town for several blocks. The highway now leaves downtown as Main Street and Beacon Street merge and they pass through a business district, where they have an intersection with unsigned MS 885 before MS 19 splits off and heads north along MS 15. MS 15/MS 19 head north through the outskirts of town along MS 15's two-lane bypass of the city, where they pass by Philadelphia Municipal Airport before MS 19 splits off at an interchange. MS 19 now leaves Philadelphia and travels through another portion of the Mississippi Band of Choctaw Indians Reservation, where it passes through the community of Choctaw and crosses the Pearl River, before curving to the northwest to have an intersection with MS 395 in Arlington and enter some hilly terrain as it briefly crosses into the southwestern-most corner of Winston County, where it has an interchange with MS 25.

MS 19 enters Attala County as it travels through hilly woodlands for the next several miles, where it becomes concurrent with MS 14, before entering the community of Williamsville, where they have an intersection with MS 736 before MS 19 splits from MS 14 and heads north along MS 35 to cross the Yockanookany River and enter Kosciusko at an interchange with the Natchez Trace Parkway. MS 19/MS 35 immediately have an intersection with MS 731 (S Huntington Street) before bypassing downtown along its west side (known as Veterans Memorial Drive), where it has an intersection with MS 735 (Old State Highway 12) before becoming concurrent with MS 12. MS 12/MS 19/MS 35 head west through business district on the north side of town as a four-lane undivided highway, where they become concurrent with MS 43 at another intersection with MS 731 (N Natchez Street). MS 19/MS 35 split off along N Jackson Street as a two-lane shortly thereafter, with MS 19 itself splitting off along Fenwick Street a little over an eighth mile later. MS 19 passes through neighborhoods before leaving Kosciusko and traveling mostly wooded areas for the next several miles, where it passes through the community of Possumneck and has an intersection with MS 440, before crossing the Big Black River into Holmes County.

The highway immediately enters the town of West city limits and comes to an end near the center of town at an intersection US 51.

Major intersections

References

External links

Magnolia Meanderings

019
Transportation in Lauderdale County, Mississippi
Transportation in Newton County, Mississippi
Transportation in Neshoba County, Mississippi
Transportation in Winston County, Mississippi
Transportation in Attala County, Mississippi
Transportation in Holmes County, Mississippi